Gurbinder Singh (born 6 June 1977) is an Indian wrestler. He competed in the men's Greco-Roman 63 kg at the 2000 Summer Olympics.

References

1977 births
Living people
Indian male sport wrestlers
Olympic wrestlers of India
Wrestlers at the 2000 Summer Olympics
Place of birth missing (living people)
Wrestlers at the 1998 Asian Games
Wrestlers at the 2002 Asian Games
Asian Games competitors for India